Trzcianka railway station is a railway station serving the town of Trzcianka, in the Greater Poland Voivodeship, Poland. The station opened in 1851 and is located on the Tczew–Kostrzyn railway. The train services are operated by PKP and Przewozy Regionalne.

Train services
The station is served by the following service(s):

Intercity services Szczecin - Stargard - Krzyz - Pila - Bydgoszcz - Torun - Kutno - Lowicz - Warsaw - Lublin - Rzeszow - Przemysl
Intercity services Gorzow Wielkopolskie - Krzyz - Pila - Bydgoszcz - Torun - Kutno - Lowicz - Warsaw
Intercity services (TLK) Gdynia Główna — Kostrzyn 
Regional services (R) Krzyz - Pila - Chojnice

References

 This article is based upon a translation of the Polish language version as of November 2016.

External links

Railway stations in Poland opened in 1851
Railway stations in Greater Poland Voivodeship
19th-century establishments in the Province of Posen